Maryanne Graham (born November 23, 1955), also known by her married name Maryanne Keever, is an American former competition swimmer who represented the United States at the 1976 Summer Olympics in Montreal, Quebec.  She competed in the preliminary heats of the women's 200-meter backstroke, finishing with the twelfth best overall performance, but she did not advance to the event final.

See also
 List of Arizona State University alumni

References

1955 births
Living people
Sportspeople from Mesa, Arizona
American female backstroke swimmers
Arizona State Sun Devils women's swimmers
Olympic swimmers of the United States
Swimmers at the 1976 Summer Olympics